Lesia L. Crumpton-Young is an American engineer and academic administrator. She became the 13th president of Texas Southern University in 2021.

Education 
Crumpton-Young completed a B.S. and M.S. degree at Texas A&M University. She was the first female African American Ph.D. graduate from the TAMU College of Engineering. She specializes in virtual reality, computer stimulations in ergonomics, design of displays and controls, workplace design, and carpal tunnel syndrome prevention.

Career 
Crumpton-Young was nominated by U.S. president Bill Clinton for a NSF Presidential Faculty Fellowship. She won the 1997 Black Engineer of the Year Educational Award. She received the 1999 Janice A. Lumpkin Educator of the Year Golden Torch Award from the National Society of Black Engineers. In 2000, she was the associate dean of research outreach at the Mississippi State University (MSU) College of Engineering. She developed the schools ergonomic and human factors program in the MSU department of industrial engineering.

At Texas A&M University, she was the associate provost and worked as a program director at the National Science Foundation. Crumpton-Young was the department head and professor of industrial engineering and management systems at the University of Central Florida. She received the Presidential Award for Excellence in Science, Mathematics, and Engineering Mentoring from U.S. president Barack Obama.

She was the vice president of research and institution advancement and chief research officer at Tennessee State University.

Crumpton-Young was the provost and senior vice president for academic affairs at Morgan State University. In 2019, she became the university's chief academic officer.

In June 2021, she was named as the 13th president of Texas Southern University, succeeding interim president Kenneth Huewitt.

Personal life 
Crumpton-Young married Reginald R. Young. They have two daughters.

Selected works

References 

Living people
Place of birth missing (living people)
Year of birth missing (living people)
African-American women academic administrators
African-American academic administrators
Heads of universities and colleges in the United States
Texas Southern University faculty
Texas A&M University alumni
Texas A&M University faculty
Mississippi State University faculty
University of Central Florida faculty
Tennessee State University faculty
Morgan State University faculty
21st-century American engineers
21st-century American women scientists
African-American women engineers
African-American engineers
American women engineers
21st-century African-American women
21st-century African-American scientists
Women heads of universities and colleges